Aspet can refer to:

 Aspet, a medieval Armenian title, equivalent to knight.

It may also refer to:
 the Ainu name of Ashibetsu, a city located in Sorachi, Hokkaidō, Japan
 Aspet, Haute-Garonne, a commune in the Haute-Garonne département, in France
American Society for Pharmacology and Experimental Therapeutics (ASPET)